Amsterdam station is an Amtrak train station in Amsterdam, New York. It is served by two daily Empire Service round trips plus the daily Maple Leaf; the Lake Shore Limited does not stop. In earlier eras, such as the postwar 1940s, no named trains from west of Syracuse stopped there.

Amsterdam station has a small unstaffed brick station building, with one low-level side platform on the north side of the two tracks.

References

External links 
 

Amtrak stations in New York (state)
Railway stations in the United States opened in 1970
Transportation in Montgomery County, New York
Former Penn Central Transportation stations